"Royalty" is a song by Canadian band, Down with Webster. The song was released as the third single from the band's album Time to Win, Vol. 2 on January 10, 2012. The song peaked at #75 on the Canadian Hot 100.

Background
The song was written by Down with Webster band members Tyler Armes, Patrick Gillet, Cameron Hunter, Andrew Martino and Martin Seja. Royalty was produced by Down with Webster, Zale Epstein and Brett Ryan Kruger. Allison of MuchMusic said that the lyrics of "Royalty" are "about a girl who parties too hard."

The beginning of the song uses a sample from the track "I'd Like" by the musical act Freshlyground.
The looped sample in the background is from New Zealand band Mt Eden (or Mt Eden Dubstep) entitled Sierra Leone.

The song was nominated for "Director of the Year" at the 2012 MuchMusic Video Awards.

Music video
A music video for the song was filmed in Toronto over two days starting on January 8, 2012. The music video was directed by Chris Wong. It premiered on February 2, 2012 on Much Music and Billboard.com. Allison of Much Music said that band "lights up the screen both figuratively with their dark party track and literally with instruments set ablaze" in the music video.

Chart performance
"Royalty" debuted on the Canadian Hot 100 at #98 on the week of February 18, 2012 and climbed up to #75 on the week of February 25, 2012.

Charts

References

2012 singles
Down with Webster songs
2011 songs
Universal Music Canada singles